The 1916 Kansas Jayhawks football team was an American football team that represented the University of Kansas as a member of the Missouri Valley Conference during the 1916 college football season. In their second season under head coach Herman Olcott, the Jayhawks compiled a 4–3–1 record (1–2–1 against conference opponents), finished in fifth place in the MVC, and were outscored by a total of 72 to 68. The team's November 18 victory over Nebraska snapped a 34-game unbeaten streak for the Cornhuskers. The Jayhawks played their home games at McCook Field in Lawrence, Kansas. Adrian Lindsey was the team captain.

Schedule

References

Kansas
Kansas Jayhawks football seasons
Kansas Jayhawks football